Carl Olof Larsson (28 May 1853 – 22 January 1919) was a Swedish painter representative of the Arts and Crafts movement. His many paintings include oils, watercolors, and frescoes. He is principally known for his watercolors of idyllic family life. He considered his finest work to be Midvinterblot (Midwinter Sacrifice), a large painting now displayed inside the Swedish National Museum of Fine Arts.

Biography

Early life and education 
Larsson was born on the 28th of May, 1853, in the Gamla stan neighborhood of Stockholm, Sweden. His parents were extremely poor, and his childhood was not happy.

Renate Puvogel, in her book Carl Larsson (Cologne: Taschen; 1994), gives detailed information about Larsson's life: "His mother was thrown out of the house, together with Carl and his brother Johan; after enduring a series of temporary dwellings, the family moved into Grev Magnigränd No. 7 (later No. 5) in what was then Ladugårdsplan, present-day Östermalm". As a rule, each room was home to three families; "penury, filth and vice thrived there, leisurely seethed and smouldered, eaten-away and rotten bodies and souls. Such an environment is the natural breeding ground for cholera", he wrote in his autobiographical novel Jag.

Larsson's father worked as a casual laborer, sailed as a stoker on a ship headed for Scandinavia, and lost the lease to a nearby mill, only to work there later as a mere grain carrier. Larsson portrays him as a loveless man lacking self-control; he drank, ranted and raved, and incurred the lifelong anger of his son after an outburst in which he declared, "I curse the day you were born". In contrast, Carl's mother worked long hours as a laundress to provide for her family.

However, at the age of thirteen, his teacher at the school for poor children urged him to apply to the Royal Swedish Academy of Arts, and he was admitted. During his first years there, Larsson felt socially inferior, confused, and shy. In 1869, at the age of sixteen, he was promoted to the "antique school" of the same academy. There Larsson gained confidence, and even became a central figure in student life. Carl earned his first medal in nude drawing. In the meantime, Larsson worked as a caricaturist for the humorous paper Kasper and as a graphic artist for the newspaper  Ny Illustrerad Tidning. His annual wages were sufficient to allow him to help support his parents financially.

Career 
After several years working as an illustrator of books, magazines, and newspapers, Larsson moved to Paris in 1877, where he spent several frustrating years as a hardworking artist without any success. Larsson was not eager to establish contact with the French progressive Impressionists; instead, along with other Swedish artists, he cut himself off from the radical movement of change.

After spending two summers in Barbizon, the refuge of the plein-air painters, he settled down with his Swedish painter colleagues in 1882, in Grez-sur-Loing at a Scandinavian artists' colony outside Paris. It was there that he met the artist Karin Bergöö (1859–1928), who soon became his wife. This was to be a turning point in Larsson's life. In Grez, Larsson painted some of his most important works, now in watercolour and very different from the oil painting technique he had previously employed.

Carl and Karin Larsson had eight children (Suzanne (b. 1884), Ulf (b. 1887), Pontus (b. 1888), Lisbeth (b. 1891), Brita (b. 1893), Mats (b. 1894), Kersti (b. 1896) and Esbjörn (b. 1900). His family became Larsson's favourite models. Many of the interiors depicted were the work of Karin Larsson, who also worked as an interior designer.

In 1888, the young family was given a small house named Little Hyttnäs at Sundborn just outside Falun in Dalarna by Karin's father Adolf Bergöö (1828–1890). Carl and Karin decorated and furnished this house according to their particular artistic taste and also for the needs of the growing family. Through his paintings and books, Little Hyttnäs has become one of the most famous artist's homes in the world, transmitting the artistic taste of its creators and making it a major line in Swedish interior design. The descendants of Carl and Karin Larsson now own this house, now known as Carl Larsson-gården, and keep it open for tourists each summer from May until October.

In his later years he suffered from bouts of depression. While working on Midvinterblot (1915), a large decoration for the vestibule of the Nationalmuseum, Larsson experienced the onset of an eye problem and a worsening of his frequent headaches. After suffering a mild stroke in January 1919, he spent his remaining time completing his memoirs. He died later that month in Falun and was buried in the cemetery of Sundborn Church (Sundborns kyrka).

Paintings 

Larsson's popularity increased considerably with the development of colour reproduction technology in the 1890s, when the Swedish publisher Bonnier published books written and illustrated by Larsson and containing full colour reproductions of his watercolours, titled A Home. However, the print runs of these rather expensive albums did not come close to that produced in 1909 by the German publisher Karl Robert Langewiesche (1874–1931). Langewiesche's choice of watercolours, drawings and text by Carl Larsson, titled Das Haus in der Sonne (Königstein, Verlag Karl Robert Langewiesche. 1909), immediately became one of the German publishing industry's best-sellers of the year—40,000 copies sold in three months, and more than 40 print runs have been produced up to 2001. Carl and Karin Larsson declared themselves overwhelmed by such success.

Carl Larsson considered his monumental works, such as his frescos in schools, museums and other public buildings, to be his most important works. His last monumental work, Midvinterblot (Midwinter Sacrifice), a  oil painting completed in 1915, had been commissioned for a wall in the National Museum in Stockholm (which already had several of his frescos adorning its walls). However, upon completion, it was rejected by the board of the museum. The fresco depicts the blót of King Domalde at the Temple of Uppsala. Decades later, the painting was purchased and placed in the National Museum.

Midvinterblot 

In his memoirs Jag (Stockholm: Albert Bonniers förlag, 1931) – published after Larsson's death – he declared his bitterness and disappointment over this rejection of the painting he himself considered to be his greatest achievement: "The fate of Midvinterblot broke me! This I admit with a dark anger. And still, it was probably the best thing that could have happened, because my intuition tells me – once again! – that this painting, with all its weaknesses, will one day, when I'm gone, be honoured with a far better placement." Larsson admitted, however, in the same memoirs  that the pictures of his family and home "became the most immediate and lasting part of my life's work. For these pictures are of course a very genuine expression of my personality, of my deepest feelings, of all my limitless love for my wife and children."

Fights between different schools of Swedish artists caused the "Midvinterblot" controversy to continue for many years. In 1987 the museum was even offered the monumental painting for free, provided it would adorn the empty wall for which it had been intended, but the museum declined the offer, so the painting was sold to the Japanese collector Hiroshi Ishizuka. In 1992, he agreed to lend it to the museum for its major Carl Larsson exhibition, where it was hung in the intended place. Public appreciation changed the experts' view of the painting, and with the help of private donations the museum was able to buy it from Ishizuka in 1997 and permanently display it in the location for which it was intended.

Gallery

Bibliography 
1895: De mina. (My Loved Ones) 
1899: Ett hem (A Home)  and 
1902: Larssons (The Larssons) 
1906: Spadarfvet – mitt lilla lantbruk (A Farm) 
1910: Åt solsidan (On the Sunny Side) ( and 
1913: Andras barn (Other People's Children) 
1931: Jag (I, Carl Larsson) (autobiography)

See also 

 Anders Zorn

References

Additional sources 

Facos, Michelle. “The Ideal Swedish Home: Carl Larsson’s Lilla Hyttnäs,” in Not at Home: The Suppression of Domesticity in Modern Art and Architecture, Christopher Reed, ed. (London: Thames and Hudson, 1996), 81–91.
Cumming, Elizabeth; Kaplan, Wendy (1991). Arts & Crafts Movement (London: Thames & Hudson)

External links 

 
 
 
The Carl and Karin Larsson Family Association
Carl Larsson Eyegate Gallery

Carl Larsson-gården website

1853 births
1919 deaths
Artists from Stockholm
19th-century Swedish painters
Swedish male painters
20th-century Swedish painters
Swedish illustrators
Swedish graphic designers
Arts and Crafts movement artists
19th-century Swedish male artists
20th-century Swedish male artists